İnece is a belde (town) in Kırklareli Province, Turkey

Geography
İnece is in the central district (Kırklareli) of the province. At  İnece is to the west of Kırklaeli at a distance of .The population of the town is  2046 as of 2011.

History 
During the Ottoman Empire era İnece (then known as Enidjiya) was founded by Bulgarians. The first mention to the settlement in Ottoman documents was in 1677. During the First Balkan War along with Turkish settlements around, it was captured by Bulgaria on 12 September 1912. But when it was returned to Ottoman Empire in the Second Balkan War on 21 July 1913 the Bulgarian population left the settlement and they were replaced by Turkish people from various Balkan countries which annexed Ottoman territory in Western Thrace.  Although the settlement was captured by Greece in 1920, it was returned to Turkey on 10 November 1922.  In 1954 the settlement was declared a seat of township.

Notable Natives

Candan Erçetin Turkish singer and songwriter
Erdal Kalkan MP

References

Populated places in Kırklareli Province
Towns in Turkey
Kırklareli Central District